The location of Hong Kong, adjacent to the coast, is not close to the system of major rivers in southern China, though the water to the west of Hong Kong is influenced by Pearl River. In 1,103 km2 of land, the territory is largely hilly with over 200 islands. Because of this, the terrain can nurture relatively shorter and smaller rivers in Hong Kong than in southern China.

Historically, these rivers once sustained intensive farming for the need of population before the age of developing new towns. Many rivers can be found in the New Territories, especially in the areas north of Tai Mo Shan, where rice growing and fish farming were once everywhere amidst several river systems.

Kowloon and New Kowloon

Hong Kong Island

New Territories

Mainland

Lantau Island

See also 

 Geography of Hong Kong
 List of buildings, sites, and areas in Hong Kong
 List of rivers in China
 Subterranean rivers in Hong Kong
 Nullah

External links 
A partial list of rivers in Hong Kong - in Chinese

Hong Kong
Rivers